Green is a lunar impact crater on the Moon's far side. It was named after British mathematician and physicist George Green in 1970. Prior to that, it was designated Crater 216. It lies just to the west of the huge walled plain Mendeleev, and is nearly joined with the west-northwestern edge of the crater Hartmann.

Description
The crater has not been significantly eroded although a few tiny craterlets lie along the edge and inner wall. The perimeter is nearly circular, but has an outward bulge along the eastern side with some indications of a landslip. The inner sides display some terrace structures, particularly to the northeast. At the midpoint of the relatively level interior floor is a central ridge. The floor is more level along the western half, with some low rises in the east. There are only a few tiny craterlets on the interior.

Satellite craters
By convention these features are identified on lunar maps by placing the letter on the side of the crater midpoint that is closest to Green.

Green M crater has a ray system and is consequently mapped as part of the Copernican system.

References

External links

Green at The Moon Wiki

Impact craters on the Moon